The 2013 AFL Europe Championship was a 16-a-side Australian rules football competition held in Dublin, Ireland between European countries. This was the second AFL Europe Championship, run by AFL Europe. Matches were played at DCU Sportsground in northern Dublin. Contested between six national teams, the Championships were won by Ireland.

Teams
Pool A
 Croatia
 Ireland
 Sweden
Pool B
 Denmark
 Germany
 Great Britain

Results

Round 1
  Great Britain: 7.1 (43) d  Denmark: 4.9 (33)
  Ireland: 3.4 (22) d  Sweden: 2.4 (16)
  Croatia: 7.5 (47) d  Germany: 5.3 (33)

Match Reports - Round 1

Round 2
  Sweden: 5.11 (41) d  Croatia: 5.2 (32)
  Great Britain: 9.12 (66) d  Germany: 2.3 (15)
  Ireland: 7.7 (49) d  Denmark: 6.3 (39)

Match Reports - Round 2

Round 3
  Denmark: 8.12 (60) d  Germany: 2.1 (13)
  Great Britain: 6.4 (40) d  Sweden: 3.2 (20)
  Ireland: 12.11 (83) d  Croatia: 1.1 (7)

Match Reports - Round 3

Finals
Grand Final:
  Ireland: 7.3 (45) d  Great Britain: 6.8 (44)

3rd Place Match:
  Denmark: 7.6 (48) d  Sweden:

5th Place Match:
  Croatia: 9.5 (59) d  Germany: 4.5 (29)

Match Reports - Grand Final Day

External links
 Dublin 2013 - AFL Europe Championships

References

Australian rules football competitions